= Kabalapur (Bharmyanatti) =

Coordinates: 15°57′N 74°38′E

- Village
- Interactive map of Kabalapur
- Country: India
- State: Karnataka
- District: Belgaum
- Talukas: Belgaum

Languages
  - Official: Kannada
- Time zone: UTC+5:30 (IST)

Kabalapur (Bharmyanatti) is a village in Belgaum district in Karnataka, India.
